Following the Egyptian Revolution of 2011, Iran appointed its first ambassador to Egypt in almost 30 years. Despite oft-wavering tensions between the two countries, they share membership in the OIC and the Developing 8.

According to a 2013 BBC World Service poll, 15% of Egyptians view Iran's influence positively, and 48% express a negative view. In a 2012 poll conducted by the Israel Project where 812 Egyptians were questioned about Iran's nuclear programs, 61% of the 812 individuals expressed support for the Iranian nuclear program.

History
Egypt was occupied by the Achaemenid and Sassanid Persian Empires during ancient times.

Despite sharing the Shia faith, Fatimid Egypt and Buyid Iran had unfriendly relations due to conflicting interests over Syria and Jazira. Both later declined under the pressure of the Seljuk Turks. Following the 1258 Sack of Baghdad, the Sunni Caliphs found asylum in Mamluk Egypt. The Ilkhanate Mongols, based in Iran, fought many wars with the Mamluks even after converting to Islam.

In the 15th century, Mamluk Egypt and Iran under the Aq Qoyunlu Padishah continued to clash in Upper Mesopotamia, culminating in the Battle of Urfa after a similar Iranian advance into Egyptian dependencies in the decade before. However, attitudes changed when Ottoman expansion tipped the balance of power in the Middle East. The Ottomans invaded Egypt once a Safavid-Mamluk alliance seemed imminent.

In 1939, diplomatic relations between Egypt and Iran were upgraded to ambassadorial level, and Youssef Zulficar Pasha was appointed as Egypt's first ambassador in Tehran. In the same year, Princess Fawzia of Egypt, the sister of King Farouk I, married Mohammad Reza Pahlavi, the then crown prince (later shah) of Iran.

The relationship between Iran and Egypt had fallen into open hostility after the Egyptian Revolution of 1952 which brought Gamal Abdel Nasser to power and the CIA-backed coup d'état in Iran in 1953 which saw the return of the Shah Mohammad Reza Pahlavi to power. Due to the positive approach of the Shah towards Israel in July 1960 Egypt and Iran expelled each other's ambassadors. The strained relations between Egypt and Iran became progressively worse when Nasser financed Ayatollah Khomeini in May 1963 to accelerate the latter's opposition to the Shah.

Following Nasser's death in 1970, the presidency of Anwar Sadat turned the relationship around quickly into an open and cordial friendship. Overnight, Egypt and Iran were turned from bitter enemies into fast friends. The relationship between Cairo and Tehran became so friendly that the Shah of Iran, Mohammad Reza Pahlavi, called Sadat his "dear brother." After the 1973 war with Israel, Iran assumed a leading role in cleaning up and reactivating the blocked Suez Canal with heavy investment. Iran also facilitated the withdrawal of Israel from the occupied Sinai Peninsula by promising to substitute with free Iranian oil the loss of the oil to the Israelis if they withdrew from the Egyptian oil wells in Western Sinai. All these added more to the personal friendship between Sadat and the Shah of Iran.

"Ties between the countries—among the largest and most influential in the Middle East—were turned hostile once again following the Islamic Revolution in Iran in 1979. Diplomatic relations between the two severed in 1980 following the admission of the deposed Shah of Iran to Egypt (where he died and was buried) and Egypt's recognition of Israel." Egypt's 1979 peace agreement with Israel also led to tense relations and Iran ceased direct flights to Egypt.

Egypt is the only Arab country without an embassy in Iran. Contentious issues include Egypt's signing of the Camp David Accords with Israel in 1979, its support for Iraq in Iran's eight-year conflict, the Islamic Republic's hailing of Khalid Islambouli, the President Anwar Sadat's assassin as a religious hero, seeing as there was both a street and mural named after him (however, the honouree was changed to Muhammad al-Durrah, the 12-year-old Palestinian boy shot and killed during the outset of the Second Intifada), and close Egyptian relations with the United States, and most of the Western European countries. In 2007, relations between the two countries thawed in the fields of diplomacy and economic trade, only to retreat during the 2008–2009 Israel–Gaza conflict when Iranian and Egyptian politicians exchanged blames over inaction towards the escalation of the conflict. It was not until the official resignation of President Hosni Mubarak in February 2011 that relations started to improve significantly. In April 2012, Iran appointed an ambassador to Egypt. Soon after Mohamed Morsi visited Iran in August 2012, it was decided to reestablish bilateral diplomatic relations, with re dedication of embassy locations. A first ambassador was nominated to represent Egypt in Iran. While overall relations have been steadily improving, continued tensions between Iran, Saudi Arabia and allied Western nations have put this development into question. In March 2013, direct flights between two countries were reinstated. In July 2013, after the uprising and subsequent overthrow that removed Mohamed Morsi and his Muslim Brotherhood-dominated government, the interim Minister of Foreign Affairs, Nabil Fahmy announced that Egypt seeks stable and positive ties with the Islamic Republic of Iran. In 2015, Egyptian President Abdel Fattah El-Sisi stated that Egypt has no relations with Iran on the Egyptian Extra News channel.

Bilateral visits
Following the Egyptian Revolution of 2011, and the appointment of ambassadors after nearly 30 years, Egyptian President Mohammed Morsi made a historic first visit to Iran since the Iranian Revolution for the Non-Aligned Movement summit on 30 August 2012, where it handed over the rotating presidency to Iran. Iranian president, Mahmoud Ahmadinejad also visited Egypt in February 2013, making him the first Iranian president to travel to Egypt since the Iranian Revolution.

See also
 Hekmat

References

Further reading